Solomon Islands national rugby sevens team participates in the Pacific Games and regional tournaments.
They finished in seventh place in the 2011 Pacific Games defeating Tokelau 33 - 7.

South Pacific Games Squad
Squad to 2015 Pacific Games:
Jonathan Maitaki Kaitu'u
Steven Momoa
Leslie Ngiumoana
John Bakila
Jonny Tapuika Maui
Solly Giungata's Seuika
Frank Tautai Paikea
Ephrem Baptiste Kelesi
Roger Tepai
Roman Pautangata Tongata
Viv Frank Kelesi
Sakus Maelasi

Previous Squads

References

National rugby sevens teams
Rugby union in the Solomon Islands
R